This is a list of events in South African sport in 2002.

Athletics
 Mbulaeni Mulaudzi wins bronze in the 800 metres at the 13th African Championships in Athletics held in Radès, Tunisia

Football (Soccer)
 19 November - South Africa (Bafana Bafana) loses to Senegal 4-1 after drawing 14-1 and then losing 4–1 on penalties in the Nelson Mandela Challenge held in Ellis Park Stadium, Johannesburg

Mind Sports
 Mind Sports South Africa hosts the International Wargames Federation's World Championships in Port Elizabeth, South Africa
 Moses Rannyadi wins gold in the Morabaraba event at such World Championships.

See also
2001 in South African sport
2002 in South Africa
2003 in South African sport
List of years in South African sport

 
South Africa